George LaVance "Vance" "Dutch" Maree (December 20, 1909 – November 20, 1976) was an American football and basketball player for the Georgia Tech Yellow Jackets of the Georgia Institute of Technology.

Early years
Vance Maree was born on December 20, 1909 in Savannah, Georgia to Andrew Morgan Maree and Frances Ann Johstoneaux.

Georgia Tech

Football
He was a prominent tackle on William Alexander's football teams. Maree is a member of the Georgia Tech Athletics Hall of Fame.

1928
Maree was a member of the 1928 team which was national champion. Maree blocked the punt in the 1929 Rose Bowl which led to an 8 to 7 Tech victory over Cal after Roy Riegels ran 65 yards in the wrong direction.

1930
One writer in 1930 said Vance Maree and Frank Speer had the reputation as "the toughest pair of tackles in the south." Maree was selected All-Southern.  He was selected as a third-team All-American by the International News Service in 1930.

References

External links

1909 births
1976 deaths
Georgia Tech Yellow Jackets football players
Georgia Tech Yellow Jackets men's basketball players
American football tackles
Basketball players from Savannah, Georgia
All-Southern college football players
Players of American football from Savannah, Georgia
American men's basketball players